Tracy Maurice Abrams Jr (born February 6, 1992) is an American professional basketball player who last played for KK Sloboda Užice of the Basketball League of Serbia.

High school career
Abrams attended Mount Carmel High School, where he was a four-year varsity basketball player and helped lead his team to 89 total wins. During high school, Abrams played on the AAU circuit with the Mac Irvin Fire and the Illinois Wolves.

In March 2010, Abrams was selected, along with two future Illinois teammates Meyers Leonard and Jereme Richmond to attend tryouts for the USA Basketball U18 National Team that competed in the FIBA Americas Under-18 Championship in San Antonio.

Recruiting
Regarded as a four-star recruit by Rivals.com, Abrams was ranked as the No. 58 athlete in the nation. In December 2008 as the top high school sophomore in Illinois, Abrams committed to the University of Illinois to play for then head coach Bruce Weber over scholarship offers from Indiana University, University of Kentucky, and University of Tennessee. His recruitment was primarily handled by then Illinois assistant coach Jerrance Howard

College career
Abrams was a member of Illinois basketball team from 2011–2017. Prior to the start of his senior season, Abrams tore his ACL, causing him to miss the entire 2014–15 season. Abrams was injured in a practice during the offseason, causing him to miss back-to-back seasons

College statistics

|-
| style="text-align:left;"| 2011–12
| style="text-align:left;"| Illinois
| 32 || 19 || 21.0 || 40.8 || 25.7 || 63.0 || 2.3 || 1.9 || 0.4 || 0.0 || 4.3
|-
| style="text-align:left;"| 2012–13
| style="text-align:left;"| Illinois
| 36 || 32 || 28.7 || 39.4 || 27.2 || 74.8 || 3.5 || 3.4 || 1.4 || 0.1 || 10.6
|-
| style="text-align:left;"| 2013–14
| style="text-align:left;"| Illinois
| 35 || 30 || 24.2 || 38.3 || 31.3 || 71.2 || 2.9 || 2.3 || 1.0 || 0.2 || 8.6
|-
| style="text-align:left;"| 2014–15
| style="text-align:left;"| Illinois
| style="text-align:center;" colspan="11"|Medical redshirt due to ACL injury
|-
| style="text-align:left;"| 2015–16
| style="text-align:left;"| Illinois
| style="text-align:center;" colspan="11"|Medical redshirt due to Achilles injury
|-
| style="text-align:left;"| 2016–17
| style="text-align:left;"| Illinois
| 35 || 35 || 30.1 || 33.3 || 27.0 || 77.2 || 3.5 || 3.2 || 1.2 || 0.2 || 10.7

Updated: March 27, 2017

Professional career
Abrams signed on to play for APOP Paphos B.C. in the Cyprus Basketball Division A league for the 2017–18 season. After averaging 16.3 points, 5.8 assists and 5.7 rebounds per game with APOP Paphos B.C. during his rookie season, Abrams signed with KK Sloboda Užice of the Basketball League of Serbia for the 2018–19 season.

Personal life
Abrams was born in Chicago to Tracy Abrams and Felicia Sales and has four brothers. He cites his favorite athlete as Derrick Rose, and his favorite basketball players from Illinois as Dee Brown and Deron Williams. Abrams earned a bachelor's degree in communication in May 2015 and a master's degree in recreation, sport and tourism in August 2016.

See also 
 List of foreign basketball players in Serbia

References

External links
RealGM profile
Illinois basketball profile
College statistics
USA Basketball profile

1992 births
Living people
American expatriate basketball people in Cyprus
American expatriate basketball people in Serbia
Basketball League of Serbia players
Basketball players from Chicago
Illinois Fighting Illini men's basketball players
KK Sloboda Užice players
Point guards
American men's basketball players